Soke may refer to:

 Soke (legal), an early Western jurisdictional concept
 Soke (dance) or eke, a Tongan stick dance, originating from Wallis and Futuna
 , a Japanese title meaning "head of the family," and is usually used to denote the headmaster of a school of Japanese martial arts
 Soke of Peterborough, an administrative region of England until 1965
 Söke, a town in the Aydın province of Turkey

See also
 Soak (disambiguation)
 Souq, an enclosed marketplace